Józef and Wiktoria Ulma were a Polish Catholic husband and wife in Markowa, Poland during the Nazi German occupation in World War II who attempted to rescue Polish Jewish families by hiding them in their own home during the Holocaust. They and their children were summarily executed on 24 March 1944 for doing so. 

Notably, despite the murder of the Ulmas—meant to strike fear into the hearts of villagers—their neighbours continued to hide Jewish fugitives until the end of World War II in Europe. At least 21 Polish Jews survived in Markowa during the occupation of Poland by Nazi Germany. They are regarded by the State of Israel as Righteous Among the Nations and are due to be beatified in the Catholic Church by Pope Francis in 2023.

Biography
 
At the onset of World War II, Józef Ulma (born in 1900) was a prominent citizen in the village of Markowa: a librarian, a photographer, active in social life and the local Catholic Youth Association. He was an educated fruit grower and a bee-keeper. His wife Wiktoria (born Wiktoria Niemczak in 1912), was a homemaker. The Ulmas had six children: Stanisława, age 8, Barbara, age 7, Władysław, age 6, Franciszek, age 4, Antoni, age 3 and Maria, age 2. Another child was due to be born just days after the family's summary execution on 24 March 1944.

Wiktoria Ulma
Wiktoria Ulma, née Niemczak (10 December 1912 – 24 March 1944) was from Markowa village near Łańcut. She was nine months pregnant at the time of her death.

Wiktoria was born in Markowa as the seventh child of Jan Niemczak and his wife Franciszka. At the age of six, Wiktoria lost her mother.  She took courses at the folk high school in Gać. In 1935, she married Józef Ulma, 12 years' her senior, with whom she had six children: Stanisława, age 8 at the time of her death, Barbara, age 7, Władysław, age 6, Franciszek, age 4, Antoni, age 3 and Maria, age 2 in 1944. Wiktoria was an educated housewife, taking care of the home and their children. Through hard work, persistence and determination, the Ulmas were able to purchase a bigger farm (5 hectares in size) in Wojsławice near Sokal (now Ukraine), and had already begun planning a relocation when the war began. At the moment of her death, Wiktoria was about to give birth to their seventh child.

Holocaust rescue
In the summer and autumn of 1942, the Nazi police deported several Jewish families of Markowa to their deaths as part of the German Final solution to the Jewish question. Only those who were hidden in Polish peasants' homes survived. Eight Jews found shelter with the Ulmas: six members of the Szall (Szali) family from Łańcut including father, mother and four sons, as well as the two daughters of Chaim Goldman, Golda (Gienia) and Layka (Lea) Didner. Józef Ulma put all eight Jews in the attic. They learned to help him with supplementary jobs while in hiding, to ease the incurred expenses.

Arrest and execution
The Ulmas were denounced by Włodzimierz Leś, a member of the Blue Police, who had taken possession of the Szall (Szali) family's real estate in Łańcut in spring 1944 and wanted to get rid of its rightful owners. In the early morning hours of 24 March 1944 a patrol of German police from Łańcut under Lieutenant Eilert Dieken came to the Ulmas' house which was on the outskirts of the village. The Germans surrounded the house and caught all eight Jews belonging to the Szali and Goldman families. They shot them in the back of the head according to eyewitness Edward Nawojski and others, who were ordered to watch the executions. Then the German gendarmes killed the pregnant Wiktoria and her husband so that the villagers would see what punishment awaited them for hiding Jews. The six children began to scream at the sight of their parents' bodies. After consulting with his superior, 23-year-old Jan Kokott, a Czech Volksdeutscher from Sudetenland serving with the German police, shot three or four of the Polish children while the other Polish children were murdered by the remaining gendarmes. Within several minutes 17 people were killed. It is likely that during the mass execution Wiktoria went into labour because the witness to her exhumation testified that he saw a head of a newborn baby between her legs.

The names of the other Nazi executioners are also known from their frequent presence in the village (Eilert Dieken, Michael Dziewulski and Erich Wilde). The village Vogt Teofil Kielar was ordered to bury the victims with the help of other witnesses. He asked the German commander, whom he had known from prior inspections and food acquisitions, why the children too had been killed. Dieken answered in German, "So that you would not have any problems with them." On 11 January 1945, in defiance of the Nazi prohibition, relatives of the Ulmas exhumed the bodies to bury them in the cemetery and found out that Wiktoria's seventh child had almost been born in the grave pit of its parents.

Commemoration

On 13 September 1995, Józef and Wiktoria Ulma were posthumously bestowed the titles of Righteous Among the Nations by Yad Vashem. On 24 March 2004 a stone memorial to honor memory of the Ulma family was erected in Markowa.  Their medals of honor were presented to Józef's surviving brother, Władysław Ulma. Their certificate informs that they tried to save Jews at the risk of their lives, but fails to mention that they died for them, as noted in the book Godni synowie naszej Ojczyzny.

On the 60th anniversary of their execution, a stone memorial was erected in the village of Markowa to honor the memory of the Ulma family. The inscription on the monument reads:  At the unveiling of the monument, the Archbishop of Przemyśl, Józef Michalik – the President of the Polish Bishops' Conference – celebrated a solemn Mass.

The local diocesan level of the Roman Catholic Church in Poland initiated the Ulmas' beatification process in 2003. The Vatican Secretary of State Cardinal Tarcisio Bertone spoke in Rome of the heroic Polish family on 24 January 2007 during the inauguration of the Italian edition of Martin Gilbert's book I giusti. Gli eroi sconosciuti dell'Olocausto ("The Righteous. Unknown Heroes of the Holocaust").

Special commemorations were held in Markowa on 24 March 2007 – 63 years after the Ulma, Szall and Goldman families were massacred. Mass was celebrated, followed by the Way of the Cross with the intention of the Ulma family's beatification. Among the guests was the President of the Council of Kraków, who laid flowers at the monument to the dead. The students of the local high school presented their own interpretation of the Ulmas' family decision to hide Jews in a short performance entitled Eight Beatitudes. There was also an evening of poetry dedicated to the memory of the murdered. Older neighbors and relatives who knew them spoke about the life of the Ulmas. One historian from the Institute of National Remembrance presented archival documents; and, the Catholic diocesan postulator explained the requirements of the beatification process. On 24 May 2011, the completed documentation of their martyrdom was passed on to Rome for completion of the beatification process.

A new Polish "National Day of the Ulma Family" has first been suggested by the former Prime Minister Jarosław Kaczyński. Subsequently, the growing support for a more formal commemoration inspired the Sejmik of Podkarpackie Voivodeship to name 2014 the Year of the Ulma Family (Rok Rodziny Ulmów). The new Ulma Family Museum of Poles Saving Jews in Markowa was scheduled to be completed in 2015.

Cause of beatification and canonization
On 17 September 2003 the Pelplin Diocese's Bishop Jan Bernard Szlaga initiated beatification process of 122 Polish martyrs died during World War II, including Józef and Wiktoria Ulma with their six children among the others. On 20 February 2017 Congregation for the Causes of Saints allowed to take over management of the process of Ulma family by Roman Catholic Archdiocese of Przemyśl. 

The fate of the Ulmas became a symbol of martyrdom of Poles killed by the Germans for helping Jews. On 17 March 2016 The Ulma Family Museum of Poles Saving Jews in World War II was opened in Markowa in presence of the President of Poland, Andrzej Duda.

On 18 December 2022 Pope Francis declared that the entire family a venerable and would be beatified in 2023.

See also
 Rescue of Jews by Poles during the Holocaust
 Polish Righteous Among the Nations

References

Sources
  The Righteous and their world. Markowa through the lens of Józef Ulma, by Mateusz Szpytma , Institute of National Remembrance, Poland
 Gisele Hildebrandt, Otto Adamski. "Markowa" Dorfimfersuchungen in dem alten deutsch-ukrainischen Grenzbereich von Landshuf. 1943. Kraków.
  Interview with the President of the Committee for the Monument in Markowa
 Józef and Wiktoria Ulma at the Israeli Holocaust memorial Yad Vashem

Married couples
Polish Righteous Among the Nations
Catholic Righteous Among the Nations
1944 deaths
Polish people executed by Nazi Germany
Polish Servants of God
Polish Roman Catholics
Polish civilians killed in World War II
People from Łańcut County